This is a list of prominent people of Bugis descent, sorted by field, industry and activity. Some of the notable individuals may appeared more than once based on their multiple contributions to the society, while persons of mixed ancestries have their respective heritage credited.

Authors and writers
 Mario Teguh, motivational speaker and consultant
 Nh. Dini, Indonesian novelist and feminist
 Manuel Godinho de Eredia, 16th century explorer and writer, born in Portuguese Malacca (partial Portuguese ancestry)
 Raja Ali Haji, a 19th-century historian, poet and scholar (Bugis-Malay)
 Rex Shelley, a Singaporean author (of mixed English, Portuguese, Malay and Bugis origin)
 Za'aba (Zainal Abidin Ahmad), Malaysian writer and language expert

Actors and actresses
 Ali Joego, stage film actor
 Andi Soraya, actress (Bugis-Arab and Cirebon ancestry)
 Andi Tenri Natassa, model, actress, TV presenter and politician (partial Dutch ancestry)
 Deddy Mizwar, Indonesian actor, film director and politician, former Vice Governor of West Java (Dutch, Betawi and Bugis ancestry)
 Deva Mahenra, actor
 Lisa Surihani, Malaysian actress, model, television host and commercial model
 Lukman Sardi, actor (Javanese and Bugis ancestry)
 Manohara Odelia Pinot, socialite, model and actress (partial American ancestry)
 Raihaanun, actress (partial Minangkabau ancestry)
 Rina Hasyim, actress
 Sophan Sophiaan, actor and politician
 Sophia Latjuba, actress (German-Jewish, Bugis and Javanese ancestry)
 Tara Basro, actress and model (partial Lampung ancestry)

Artist and musicians 
 Andi Fadly Arifuddin, Padi lead singer
 Andi Rianto, Indonesian film score composer
 Dewiq, Indonesian singer and songwriter (half Dutch ancestry)
 Eva Celia, actress, singer-songwriter (Dutch, German-Jewish, Bugis, Javanese, Minangkabau and Madurese ancestry)
 Hady Mirza, Singaporean singer (partial Chinese ancestry)
 Hannah Al Rashid, actress, model and activist (partial French ancestry)
 Idris Sardi, Indonesian violinist and composer
 Once Mekel (born Elfonda Mekel), former lead vocals for Dewa
 Pasha, politician and Ungu lead singer
 Sandhy Sondoro, Indonesian singer-songwriter (Palembangese, Javanese, Buginese, and Minangkabau ancestry)
 Saridjah Niung, Indonesian musician, teacher, radio announcer, playwright and batik artist
 Syafinaz Selamat, Malaysian singer and lecturer
 Taufik Batisah, Singaporean singer (partial Indian ancestry)
 Yunalis Zarai, Malaysian singer (Bugis-Malay)
 Ziana Zain, Malaysian singer (partial Indian ancestry)

Businessmen
 Anas Alam Faizli, Malaysian entrepreneur (quarter Bugis ancestry)
 Achmad Arnold Baramuli, Indonesian prosecutor, politician and businessman (part Manado ancestry)
 Nazir Razak, Malaysian banker (Bugis and Malay ancestry)
 Nurdin Halid, politician and businessman

Diplomats
 Andi Muhammad Ghalib, Attorney General of Indonesia (1998–1999), Ambassador to India (2008–2013)
 Hamid Awaludin, former Ambassador of the Republic of Indonesia to the Russian Federation and Belarus

Film directors
 Riri Riza, film director, producer and screenwriter 
 Pierre Coffin, French voice actor, animator and film director (partial French ancestry)

Head of governments
 Abdul Razak Hussein, 2nd Prime Minister of Malaysia
 B. J. Habibie, third President of Indonesia (Bugis, Gorontalese, Javanese ancestry)
 Ismail Abdul Rahman, former Deputy Prime Minister of Malaysia (1970-1973)
 Jusuf Kalla, former Vice President of Indonesia
 Muhyiddin Yassin,former Prime Minister of Malaysia (partial Javanese ancestry)
 Najib Razak, 6th Prime Minister of Malaysia (Bugis and Malay ancestry)

Monarch
 Abu Bakar of Johor, the 21st sultan of the Johor Sultanate in Malaysia (Bugis-Malay)
 Alauddin Ahmad Syah, twenty-third Sultan of Aceh (1727 to 1735) and progenitor of the Bugis Dynasty of Aceh
 Alauddin Muhammad Da'ud Syah II, thirty-fifth and last Sultan of Aceh 
 Andi Djemma, former King of Luwu, Indonesian nationalist
 Andi Mappanyukki, 32nd King of Bone, declared a National Hero of Indonesia in 2004
 Arung Palakka, 17th-century prince and warrior
 Hisamuddin of Selangor, second Yang di-Pertuan Agong of Malaya and the sixth Sultan of Selangor
 La Maddukelleng,  supreme leader of Wajo 
 Raja Haji Fisabilillah, warrior, and also the Yang Dipertuan Muda (Crown Prince) of the Johor-Riau Sultanate from 1777 to 1784 (Bugis-Malay)
 Sultan Salehuddin Shah ibni Almarhum Daeng Chelak, the 1st Sultan of Selangor in Malaysia
 Siti Aisyah We Tenriolle, the monarch of the Kingdom of Tanette, an advocate of women's rights and responsible for the translation of La Galigo epic
 Tengku Ampuan Jemaah, second Raja Permaisuri Agong of Malaysia and Tengku Ampuan of Selangor

Journalists
 Meutya Hafid, Indonesian newscaster and politician
 Najwa Shihab, journalist and TV presenter (Arab-Bugis ancestry)

Judiciary
 Abraham Samad, Indonesian lawyer and activist
 Farhat Abbas, Indonesian lawyer
 Muhammad Hatta Ali, thirteenth Chief Justice of the Supreme Court of Indonesia
 Harifin Tumpa, twelfth Chief Justice of the Supreme Court of Indonesia as well as the first Deputy Chief Justice of the Supreme Court Indonesia for non-judicial affairs.

Military personnel
 Idham Azis, former Chief of the Indonesian National Police
 Mohammad Jusuf, Indonesian military general
 Tanribali Lamo, Indonesian military officer and bureaucrat, former Director General of National Unity and Politics in the Ministry of Home Affairs.
 Yunus Yosfiah, Indonesian politician and a decorated member of the Indonesian Army

National heroes
 Andi Abdullah Bau Massepe, Indonesian freedom fighter 
 Andi Djemma, former King of Luwu, Indonesian nationalist
 Andi Mappanyukki, 32nd King of Bone, declared a National Hero of Indonesia in 2004
 Pajonga Daeng Ngalie, Indonesian governor
 Ranggong Daeng Romo, Indonesian freedom fighter
 Andi Sultan Daeng Radja, Indonesian politician, independence activist

Politicians
 Abdul Kahar Muzakkar, leader of an Islamic movement in South Sulawesi 
 Abdul Rahman Mohamed Yassin, 1st President of the Dewan Negara Malaysia
 Alwi Shihab, Indonesian Coordinating Minister for People's Welfare in 2004–2005 and the Foreign Minister of Indonesia from 1999 to 2001 (Arab-Bugis ancestry)
 Andi Mallarangeng, former Indonesian Minister of Youth and Sports in the Second United Indonesia Cabinet (2009–2012)
 Andi Muhammad Suryady Bandy, Malaysian politician, Sabah State Assistant Minister of Youth and Sports
 Andi Oddang, former Governor of South Sulawesi
 Andi Sudirman Sulaiman, current Governor of South Sulawesi
 Amir Syamsuddin, former Minister of Justice and Human Rights of Indonesia (2011–2014)
 Anis Matta, politician
 Azalina Othman Said, Malaysian politician and lawyer (Bugis and Arab ancestry)
 Beddu Amang, economist, former head of the State Logistics Agency (Bulog) from 1995 to 1998
 Daeng Sanusi Daeng Mariok, Malaysian politician
 Dira Abu Zahar, Malaysian politician (Bugis-Malay ancestry)
 Erna Witoelar, former Minister of Human Settlements and Regional Development of Indonesia
 Ibrahim Yaacob, Malayan politician
 Isran Noor, Governor of East Kalimantan (partial Kutai ancestry)
 Indah Putri Indriani, politician, current regent of North Luwu Regency.
 Idrus Marham, former Indonesian Social Affairs Minister
 Ma'mun Sulaiman, Malaysian Politician
 Oesman Sapta Odang, Indonesian politician of the People's Conscience Party (Hanura) (partial Minang ancestry)
 Opu Daeng Risaju, Indonesian independence activist
 Rizal Mallarangeng, politician, senior advisor to Indonesia's Coordinating Economic Minister (2004-2005) and Coordinating Welfare Minister (2005-2008)
 Sarifuddin Sudding, politician, member of the People's Representative Council.
 Syahrul Yasin Limpo, Indonesian Minister of Agriculture

Religious leaders
 Ali Yafie, faqih and chairman of the Indonesian Ulema Council
 Muhammad Quraish Shihab, religious scholar (Arab-Bugis ancestry)

Sports
 Ahmad Amiruddin, footballer
 Andi Oddang, former footballer
 Hamka Hamzah, professional footballer
 Isnan Ali, retired footballer
 La Nyalla Mattalitti, former chairman of the Football Association of Indonesia
 Ramang, former footballer
 Syamsidar, former footballer
 Zulkifli Syukur, professional footballer 
 Kusuma Wardhani, former archer
 Achmad Hisyam, former footballer
 Sunar Sulaiman, footballer
 Rachmat Latief, footballer
 Maulwi Saelan, Indonesian footballer
 Rahmat, footballer
 Hendra Ridwan, professional footballer

See also
 List of Acehnese people
 List of Batak people
 List of Chinese Indonesians
 List of Javanese people 
 List of Minangkabau people
 List of Moluccan people
 List of Sundanese people

References

Bugis
Bugis